The 2010 Falsterbo Horse Show, the official Swedish show jumping horse show, was held between July 8 and July 11 as CSIO 5* and CDI 5*.

The first horse show were held 1920 in Falsterbo, in 1969 the first show jumping derby was held here.

FEI Nations Cup of Sweden 
The 2010 FEI Nations Cup of Sweden was part of the 2010 Falsterbo Horse Show. It was the fifth competition of the 2010 Meydan FEI Nations Cup. 

The 2010 FEI Nations Cup of the Sweden was held at Friday, July 9, 2010 at 2:30 pm. The competing teams were: France, the United States of America, Germany, Switzerland, the Netherlands, Ireland, Sweden, Great Britain, Spain and Poland. 

The competition was a show jumping competition with two rounds and optionally one jump-off. The height of the fences were up to 1.60 meters. Eight of ten teams were allowed to start in the second round.

The competition was endowed with 200,000 €.

(grey penalties points do not count for the team result)

Grand Prix Spécial (B-Final)
The 2010 Falsterbo Horse Show was the venue of the second competition of the World Dressage Masters (WDM) - rider ranking, season 2010/2011.

All competitors starts first in the Grand Prix de Dressage at Thursday. The eight best-placed competitors of the Grand Prix de Dressage are allowed to start in the A-Final (the Grand Prix Freestyle). It some of best-placed competitors want to start in the B-Final, the same number of competitors, who are placed after the best-placed competitors, move up in the A-Final.

The B-Final of the World Dressage Masters competitions at 2010 Falsterbo Horse Show was held on July 9, 2010 at 2:00 pm. It was endowed with 30,000 €. The B-Final was held as Grand Prix Spécial, the competition with the highest definite level of dressage competitions.

(top 3 of 6 competitors)

Grand Prix Freestyle (A-Final) 
The Grand Prix Freestyle (or Grand Prix Kür) was the A-Final of the World Dressage Masters competitions at 2010 Falsterbo Horse Show (see also Grand Prix Spécial).

A Grand Prix Freestyle was a Freestyle dressage competition. The level of this competition is at least the level of a Grand Prix de Dressage, but it can be higher than the level of a Grand Prix Spécial.

The Grand Prix Freestyle at the 2010 Falsterbo Horse Show was held at Saturday, July 10, 2010 at 1:00 pm. It was endowed with 60,000 €.

(top 5 of 8 competitors)

JMS Falsterbo Derby 
The Falsterbo Derby was an important show jumping competition at the 2010 Falsterbo Horse Show. The sponsor of this competition was JMS. A Derby was a show jumping competition with special fences like walls or natural fences build of wood (an other example of a derby competition in show jumping is the British Jumping Derby).

This competition was held at Saturday, July 10, 2010 at 3:45 pm. The competition was a show jumping competition with one round and one jump-off.

(Top 5 of 23 Competitors)

Longines Falsterbo Grand Prix 
The Grand Prix was the mayor show jumping competition of the 2010 Falsterbo Horse Show. The sponsor of this competition was Longines. It was held at Sunday, July 11, 2010 at 3:00 pm. The competition was a show jumping competition with two rounds, the height of the fences were up to 1.60 meters.

(Top 5 of 44 Competitors)

References

External links 
 official website
 2010 results

2010 in show jumping
Falsterbo Horse Show
July 2010 sports events in Europe